Gröbenzell is a municipality near Munich in the district Fürstenfeldbruck, in Bavaria, Germany. It was founded in 1952, and has a population of 19,202. Gröbenzell is often called a garden city, which is also illustrated by the two flowers in the coat of arms.

Geography

Gröbenzell is located at the creek Gröbenbach at the margin of the Dachauer Moos, an area that once was predominantly marshy. Since the end of the 19th century, most of that land was dried up by Drainage. Nowadays most of the surrounding area is used as farmland. Also to the north and the south of Gröbenzell lie some small lakes, which are used as recreation areas by the residents of the area.

To the south Gröbenzell seamlessly borders Puchheim, to the north-west lies Olching and to the east the Munich district Lochhausen is located.

History

The name Gröbenzell was first documented in 1725. It refers to a toll ("Zoll") station that was built next to the creek Gröbenbach to supervise the construction of a street between Lochhausen and Olching. Thus the customs barrier and the creek can still be seen in the coat of arms. When the railway from Munich to Augsburg was built in 1840, peat cutters settled in the region. Gröbenzell predominantly remained a settlement for peat cutters until World War II. After the war, Gröbenzell grew fast since a lot of refugees moved to Munich and its suburbs. In 1952 the town Gröbenzell was officially founded by merging several districts of Munich, Puchheim, Olching and Geiselbullach to one community.

Commerce and infrastructure

Even though most of the residents go to work in Munich, there are several commercial and industrial businesses in the commercial area of Gröbenzell.

Gröbenzell is well connected to the regional and national traffic network by S-Bahn and Autobahn.

Twin towns

 Pilisvörösvár, Hungary, since 1990.
 Garches, France, since 1994.

References

External links 

Fürstenfeldbruck (district)